ABPP may stand for:

 Activity-based protein profiling, a proteomic technology to monitor enzyme activity
 Agile business process platform, a main product area of i2 Technologies
 American Battlefield Protection Program, a United States federal government program under the purview of the National Park Service
 American Board of Professional Psychology